Hans Bock (5 October 1928 – 21 January 2008) was a German chemist born in Hamburg and died in Königstein im Taunus.

Career 
Hans Bock studied chemistry at the University of Munich, where he received his PhD in 1958 for his work on water-free hydrazine in the group of Egon Wiberg. In 1964 he received his post doctoral lecture qualification after work on phosphorus containing diacenes in the same research group. Subsequently, he had a three-year visit in the group of Edgar Heilbronner at ETH Zurich/Switzerland, where he worked on applications of the HMO-model, leading to the textbook: The HMO model and its application.

In 1968 he was announced full professor for inorganic chemistry at the University of Frankfurt.

Research 
Bock is the author and co-author of more than 500 publications in peer-reviewed journals. His research focused on preparation of element-organic compounds and their characterisation by appropriate physical measurement methods. Main focus was set on development and application of X-ray photoelectron spectroscopy (XPS) for detection and characterisation of transient molecules.

He proposed the use of the super silyl group in 1993.

Literature 
 The HMO model and its application by Edgar Heilbronner and Hans Bock, translated by W.Martin and A.J.Rackstraw

Recognition 
He was external member of Max-Planck-Gesellschaft and became adjunct professor at University of Michigan (Ann Arbor) and TU München. He received two honorary doctorates by universities of Hamburg and Montpellier/France.

In 1987 he received the Wilhelm-Klemm-Award by the Gesellschaft Deutscher Chemiker (GDCh).

References

1928 births
2008 deaths
Scientists from Hamburg
20th-century German chemists
Ludwig Maximilian University of Munich alumni
Academic staff of Goethe University Frankfurt
University of Michigan faculty
Members of the Göttingen Academy of Sciences and Humanities